{{DISPLAYTITLE:C9H18}}
The molecular formula C9H18 (molar mass: 126.24 g/mol, exact mass: 126.1409 u) may refer to:

 Cyclononane
 Nonene
 Tripropylene, or propylene trimer